Vallavan ( Expert) is a 2006 Indian Tamil-language romantic action film written and directed by Silambarasan, starring himself as the titular character along with Reema Sen and Nayanthara as lead heroines whilst Sandhya, Santhanam, Premji, and Sathyan play supporting roles. The dialogues are written by Balakumaran. The film's score and soundtrack are composed by Yuvan Shankar Raja. The film released on 21 October 2006. It received mixed to positive reviews and became Simbu's 2nd best success after Manmadhan (2004).

Plot
Vallavan is a happy-go-lucky college student who is friends with Suji, Soori and Subbu. While they are at temple, Vallavan sees Swapna and immediately falls in love with her. Vallavan encounters Swapna again in college and she is revealed to be a teacher who is three years elder than him. He decides to woo her by turning into Pallan, an ugly duckling with buck teeth and thick glasses. Pallan makes Swapna fall in love with him for his heart. When Swapna learns that Pallan is younger than her (from one of Vallavan's rivals in the college) and also a student, she dumps him and decides to marry another man.

As Vallavan walks in the streets wondering how things got so messy, he recalls his school life. When he was in higher secondary school, Vallavan met the hysteric and toxic Geetha, who ensures that Vallavan is mad about her. Learning of her true nature, he ends things with her. She is not ready to let him go so easily, and he teaches her a lesson.

Geetha returns for payback and tells Vallavan that she is the reason for the current mess in his life. In an effort to win his love, Vallavan once again as Pallan, goes to convince Swapna, and tells her that even though he is younger than her, his love for her is true and that age does not matter. Swapna realizes her mistake and they reconcile, infuriating Geetha. In a climax displaying her disorder, she kidnaps Suji, and Vallavan arrives and frees her. The film fast-forwards to three years later. Geetha is released from a mental asylum. The moment she steps out, she exhibits her fiery psychotic expression, showing that she never actually recovered. Vallavan is waiting for her, and they communicate telepathetically, with Vallavan saying that she cannot hurt him.

Cast

Silambarasan as Vallavan a.k.a. Pallan
Reema Sen as Geethakumari "Geeta" , Vallavan's ex-girlfriend 
Nayanthara as Swapna, a teacher who's Vallavan's love interest and fiancée.
Sandhya as Suji, Vallavan's best friend
Santhanam as Soori, Suji's brother
Sathyan as Subbu
Premji as Swapna's friend
S. V. Shekhar as Suji and Soori's father
Janaki Sabesh as Suji and Soori's mother
Shankar as Vallavan's school friend (flashback)
Karthik Sabesh as Vallavan's school friend (flashback)
Guhan Shanmugam
Balakumaran as Psychiatrist (cameo appearance)
T. Rajendar as dancer in song "Yammadi Aathadi" (special appearance)
Kanal Kannan as a spectator watching Vallavan's fight from his car (cameo appearance)
Mahat Raghavendra as Vallavan's friend and miscellaneous (uncredited role)
Jagan as Vallavan's friend (uncredited role)
Thara Srinivasan as Premji's wife

Music

The music was scored by noted musician and Silambarasan's friend, Yuvan Shankar Raja, coming together again after churning out the successful album of Manmadhan (2004). The soundtrack was released on 1 June 2006 and features 9 tracks, including 7 songs and two Instrumental pieces. As it was the case in Manmadhan, a second Soundtrack was released afterwards with bit songs that feature in the film but not on the first soundtrack along with pieces from the film score. The lyrics were penned by Vaali, Thamarai, film director Perarasu and Silambarasan himself. Karunakaran wrote the lyrics of the bit song "Kadhal Vandhale", released in the second edition.

Yuvan Shankar Raja won accolades for his soundtrack, whereas especially the songs "Loosu Penne" and "Yammaadi Aathaadi" were both popular. His film score, too, was lauded, called as the film's highlight and "backbone of the film", while he himself was hailed as the film's "real hero".

Release

Critical reception
Vallavan received mixed to positive reviews from critics at the time of release. Critics praised the performance of the actors, particularly the chemistry between the lead actors Silambarasan and Nayanthara while Reemma Sen's portrayal as a psychopathic woman garnered critical acclaim. Reema Sen's performance as a psychotic maniac created chills in the hearts of the audience. Watching the sudden transformation of a happy school going Reema Sen into a lunatic out for vengeance was eerily brilliant! Her portrayal of a sadistic lover was very convincing and the actress did justice to the role. The Hindu wrote: "Vallavan's basic sketch is simpler than Manmadhan, though the maker has lent it his trademark frills". Sify gave 2.5/5 stars to Vallavan and said:
"If you are looking for some wholesome entertainment, then Vallavan is worth your time and money". Behindwoods.com commented: "On a positive note, the glamorous quotient of two heroines along with music and the youth element can play to Vallavan's advantage". Oneindia wrote: "Yuvan's music and Santhanam's comedy provide the much-needed relief as the film's dark and tension filled screenplay roils throughout with murky games of passion and revenge."

Box office
Vallavan was hit at the box office. The film also featured, prior to release, in "most awaited" lists from entertainment sites. The film got a grand release during Diwali 2006 along with other films like Ajith's Varalaru, Jiiva's E, Arya's Vattaram and Sarath Kumar's Thalaimagan. Due to the pre-release hype it created, Vallavan received a grand opening.

Controversies
While filming for Vallavan, Nayantara was romantically linked with the film's director and co-actor Silambarasan. She initially denied the reports. In November 2006, however, she confirmed that she and Silambarasan had broken up, going on to add that she would not work with him again. However, they later went on to appear in Idhu Namma Aalu (2016). During the making, actress Reema Sen threatened legal action against Silambarasan after he made changes to the scope of her role in the film. She later stated she regretted her claim and was proud to have won critical acclaim for the character.

References

External links
 

2006 films
2000s Tamil-language films
Indian romantic thriller films
Films scored by Yuvan Shankar Raja
Films directed by Silambarasan
2006 directorial debut films
2000s romantic thriller films
2000s masala films